Leung Kam Fai (born 17 July 1986 in Hong Kong) is a former Hong Kong professional footballer who played as a defender.

References

External links
Profile at HKFA.com

Accolades

1986 births
Living people
Hong Kong footballers
Association football defenders
Happy Valley AA players
Tai Po FC players
Mutual FC players
Southern District FC players
Hong Kong First Division League players